In geometry, the Spieker center is a special point associated with a plane triangle. It is defined as the center of mass of the perimeter of the triangle. The point is named in honor of the 19th-century German geometer Theodor Spieker. The Spieker center is a triangle center and it is listed as the point X(10) in Clark Kimberling's Encyclopedia of Triangle Centers.

Location

The following result can be used to locate the Spieker center of any triangle.
This circle is known as the Spieker circle.

The Spieker center is also located at the intersection of the three cleavers of triangle . A cleaver of a triangle is a line segment that bisects the perimeter of the triangle and has one endpoint at the midpoint of one of the three sides.

To see that the incenter of the medial triangle coincides with the intersection point of the cleavers, consider a homogeneous wireframe in the shape of triangle  consisting of three wires in the form of line segments having lengths . The wire frame has the same center of mass as a system of three particles of masses  placed at the midpoints    of the sides . It follows that the center of mass of the wire frame is the point of concurrence of the internal bisectors of the angles of the triangle   , which is the incenter of the medial triangle   .

Properties

Let  be the Spieker center of triangle .
 
 
 is the radical center of the three excircles.
 is the  cleavance center of triangle  
 is collinear with the incenter, the centroid, and the  Nagel point of triangle . Moreover,

  lies on the Kiepert hyperbola.  is the point of concurrence of the lines  where  are similar, isosceles and similarly situated triangles  constructed on the sides of  triangle  as bases, having the common base angle

References

Triangle centers